Infinite chess is any variation of the game of chess played on an unbounded chessboard. Versions of infinite chess have been introduced independently by multiple players, chess theorists, and mathematicians, both as a playable game and as a model for theoretical study. It has been found that even though the board is unbounded, there are ways in which a player can win the game in a finite number of moves.

Background

Classical (FIDE) chess is played on an 8×8 board (64 squares).  However, the history of chess includes variants of the game played on boards of various sizes.  A predecessor game called courier chess was played on a slightly larger 12×8 board (96 squares) in the 12th century, and continued to be played for at least six hundred years.  Japanese chess (shogi) has been played historically on boards of various sizes; the largest is taikyoku shōgi ("ultimate chess"). This chess-like game, which dates to the mid 16th century, was played on a 36×36 board (1296 squares). Each player starts with 402 pieces of 209 different types, and a well-played game would require several days of play, possibly requiring each player to make over a thousand moves.

Chess player Jianying Ji was one of many to propose infinite chess, suggesting a setup with the chess pieces in the same relative positions as in classical chess, with knights replaced by nightriders and a rule preventing pieces from travelling too far from opposing pieces. Numerous other chess players, chess theorists, and mathematicians who study game theory have conceived of variations of infinite chess, often with different objectives in mind. Chess players sometimes use the scheme simply to alter the strategy; since chess pieces, and in particular the king, cannot be trapped in corners on an infinite board, new patterns are required to form a checkmate. Theorists conceive of infinite chess variations to expand the theory of chess in general, or as a model to study other mathematical, economic, or game-playing strategies.

Decidability of short mates
For infinite chess, it has been found that the mate-in-n problem is decidable; that is, given a natural number n and a player to move and the positions (such as on ) of a finite number of chess pieces that are uniformly mobile and with constant and linear freedom, there is an algorithm that will answer if there is a forced checkmate in at most n moves. One such algorithm consists of expressing the instance as a sentence in Presburger arithmetic and using the decision procedure for Presburger arithmetic.

The winning-position problem is not known to be decidable.  In addition to the lack of an obvious upper bound on the smallest such n when there is a mate-in-n, there could also be positions for which there is a forced mate but no integer n such that there is a mate-in-n.  For example, there could be a position such that after one move by black, the number of moves until black gets checkmated will equal the distance by which black moved whichever piece black moved.

See also
 List of chess variants
 Fairy chess pieces

References

External links
 Infinite Chess at The Chess Variant Pages
 

Chess variants
Combinatorial game theory
Abstract strategy games